Mark LaMura (October 18, 1948 – September 11, 2017) was an American actor. His name was occasionally spelled as Mark La Mura or Mark Lamura.

Early years 
LaMura was born in Perth Amboy, New Jersey, one of six siblings born to Robert E. LaMura and Elizabeth ( Devlin) LaMura. He graduated from Mater Dei High School. He was educated at Kent State University, St. Joseph's College, and the American Academy of Dramatic Arts.

Career
He portrayed Mark Dalton on All My Children for 11 years, and made special guest appearances in 1994, 1995, and 2005. In 1988, he was nominated for the Daytime Emmy Award for his performance. He also appeared on the soap operas As the World Turns and One Life to Live, and guest starred on a number of television series including Star Trek: The Next Generation, 30 Rock, Damages, Law & Order: Special Victims Unit,  and The Sopranos. 

He earned credentials in theatrical productions such as Shakespeare plays and The Rise Of Dorothy Hale. He played Oscar Madison in the 2013 revival production of The Odd Couple, with co-star Jeff Talbott as Felix Unger.

Personal life 
LaMura was married to Elizabeth Maclellan, an actress, and they had one daughter, Gabrielle. 

LaMura died due to complications from lung cancer on September 11, 2017.

References

Further reading
 "La Mura is No Pigeon", Akron Beacon Journal [Akron, OH], June 23, 1994, pg. B7.

External links
 
 
 

1948 births
2017 deaths
American male stage actors
American male soap opera actors
Place of death missing
Male actors from New Jersey
Mater Dei High School (New Jersey) alumni
People from Perth Amboy, New Jersey
People from Red Bank, New Jersey
Deaths from lung cancer
Deaths from cancer in New Jersey